The long s , also known as the medial s or initial s, is an archaic form of the lowercase letter . It replaced the single s, or one or both of the letters s in a 'double s' sequence (e.g., "ſinfulneſs" for "sinfulness" and "poſſeſs" or "poſseſs" for "possess"—but never *"poſſeſſ"). The modern  letterform is known as the 'short', 'terminal', or 'round' s. In typography, it is known as a type of swash letter, commonly referred to as a "swash s". The long s is the basis of the first half of the grapheme of the German alphabet ligature letter , (eszett or  [sharp s]).

Rules 
This list of rules for the long s is not exhaustive, and it applies only to books printed during the 17th and 18th centuries in English-speaking countries. Similar rules exist for other European languages.
 A round s is always used at the end of a word ending with s: "his", "complains", "ſucceſs"
 However, long s is maintained in abbreviations such as "ſ." for "ſubſtantive" (substantive), and "Geneſ." for "Geneſis" (Genesis)
 Before an apostrophe (indicating an omitted letter), a round s is used: "us'd" and "clos'd"
 Before and after an f, a round s is used: "offset", "ſatisfaction."
 Before a breaking hyphen at the end of the line, a long s must be used: "Shaftſ-bury". (When hyphenation was not required, the word was spelled , with a round s.)
 In the 17th century, the round s was used before k and b: "ask", "husband"; in the 18th century: "aſk" and "huſband".

Otherwise, long s is used: "ſong", "ſubſtitute".

In handwriting, these rules do not apply—the long s is usually confined to preceding a round s, either in the middle or at the end of a word—for example, "aſsure", "Bleſsings".

History

The long s was derived from the old Roman cursive medial s. When the distinction between majuscule (uppercase) and minuscule (lowercase) letter forms became established, toward the end of the eighth century, it developed a more vertical form. During this period, it was occasionally used at the end of a word, a practice that quickly died but that was occasionally revived in Italian printing between about 1465 and 1480. Thus, the general rule that the long s never occurred at the end of a word is not strictly correct, although the exceptions are rare and archaic. The double s in the middle of a word was also written with a long s and a short s, as in: "Miſsiſsippi". In German typography, the rules are more complicated: short s also appears at the end of each component within a compound word, and there are more detailed rules and practices for special cases.

The long s is often confused with the minuscule f, sometimes even having an f-like nub at its middle but on the left side only in various Roman typefaces and in blackletter. There was no nub in its italic type form, which gave the stroke a descender that curled to the left and which is not possible without kerning in the other type forms mentioned. For this reason, the short s was also normally used in combination with f: for example, in "ſatisfaction".

The nub acquired its form in the blackletter style of writing. What looks like one stroke was actually a wedge pointing downward. The wedge's widest part was at that height (x-height) and capped by a second stroke that formed an ascender that curled to the right. Those styles of writing, and their derivatives, in type design had a crossbar at the height of the nub for letters f and t, as well as for k. In Roman type, except for the crossbar on medial s, all other cross bars disappeared.

The long s was used in ligatures in various languages. The long s survives in Fraktur typefaces.

(An alternative hypothesis claims that the German letter ß originated in Tironian notes.)

Some old orthographic systems of Slavonic and Baltic languages used ſ and s as two separate letters with different phonetic values. In the original version of the alphabet, majuscule  was shared by both letters.

These orthographies were in actual use until 1938. Some of these developed a capital form which resembles the IPA letter see .

Decline
In general, the long s fell out of use in Roman and italic typefaces in professional printing well before the middle of the 19th century. It rarely appears in good-quality London printing after 1800, though it lingers provincially until 1824 and is found in handwriting into the second half of the nineteenth century, being sometimes seen later on in archaic or traditionalist printing such as printed collections of sermons. Woodhouse's The Principles of Analytical Calculation, published by the Cambridge University Press in 1803, uses the long s throughout its Roman text.

Abandonment by printers and type founders
The long s disappeared from new typefaces rapidly in the mid-1790s, and most printers who could afford to do so had discarded older typefaces by the early years of the 19th century. Pioneer of type design John Bell (1746–1831), who started the British Letter Foundry in 1788, commissioned the William Caslon Company to produce a new modern typeface for him and is often "credited with the demise of the long s".

Unlike the 1755 edition, which uses the long s throughout, the 1808 edition of the Printer's Grammar describes the transition away from the use of the long s among type founders and printers in its list of available sorts:

An individual instance of an important work using s instead of the long s occurred in 1749, with Joseph Ames's Typographical Antiquities, about printing in England 1471–1600, but "the general abolition of long s began with John Bell's British Theatre (1791)".

In Spain, the change was mainly accomplished between the years 1760 and 1766; for example, the multivolume  made the switch with volume 16 (1762). In France, the change occurred between 1782 and 1793. Printers in the United States stopped using the long s between 1795 and 1810: for example, acts of Congress were published with the long s throughout 1803, switching to the short s in 1804. In the US, a late use of the long s was in Low's Encyclopaedia, which was published between 1805 and 1811. Its reprint in 1816 was one of the last such uses recorded in America. The most recent recorded use of the long s typeset among English printed Bibles can be found in the Lunenburg, Massachusetts, 1826 printing by W. Greenough and Son. The same typeset was used for the 1826 printed later by W. Greenough and Son, and the statutes of the United Kingdom's colony Nova Scotia also used the long s as late as 1816. Some examples of the use of the long and short s among specific well-known typefaces and publications in the UK include the following:
 The Caslon typeface of 1732 has the long s.
 The Caslon typeface of 1796 has the short s only.
 In the UK, The Times of London made the switch from the long to the short s with its issue of 10 September 1803.
 The Catherwood typeface of 1810 has the short s only.
 Encyclopædia Britannica 5th edition, completed in 1817, was the last edition to use the long s. The 1823, 6th edition uses the short s.
 The Caslon typeface of 1841 has the short s only.
 Two typefaces from Stephenson Blake, both 1838–1841, have the short s only.

When the War of 1812 began, the contrast between the nonuse of the long s by the United States, and its continued use by the United Kingdom, is illustrated by the Twelfth US Congress's use of the short s of today in the US declaration of war against the United Kingdom, and, in contrast, the continued use of long s within the text of Isaac Brock's counterpart document responding to the declaration of war by the United States.

Early editions of Scottish poet Robert Burns that have lost their title page can be dated by their use of the long s; that is, Dr. James Currie's edition of the Works of Robert Burns (Liverpool, 1800 and many reprintings) does not use the long s, while editions from the 1780s and early 1790s do.

In printing, instances of the long s continue in rare and sometimes notable cases in the UK until the end of the 19th century, possibly as part of a consciously antiquarian revival of old-fashioned type. For example,
 The Chiswick Press reprinted the Wyclyffite New Testament in 1848 in the Caslon typeface, using the long s; Chiswick Press, run by Charles Whittingham II (nephew of Charles Whittingham) from c. 1832–1870s, reprinted classics like Geoffrey Chaucer's The Canterbury Tales in a font of Caslon that included the long s.
 The "antiqued" first edition of Thackeray's The History of Henry Esmond (1852), a historical novel set in the eighteenth century, prints long s, and not just when doubled as in "mistreſs's".
 Mary Elizabeth Coleridge's first volume of poetry, Fancy's Following, published in 1896, was printed with the long s.
 Collections of sermons were published using the long s until the end of the 19th century.

In Germany, Fraktur-family typefaces (such as Tannenberg, used by Deutsche Reichsbahn for station signage) continued in widespread official use until the "Normal Type" decree of 1941 required that they be phased out. (Private use had already largely ceased.)

Eventual abandonment in handwriting

After its decline and disappearance in printing in the early years of the 19th century, the long s persisted into the second half of the century in manuscript. In handwriting used for correspondence and diaries, its use for a single s seems to have disappeared first: most manuscript examples from the 19th century use it for the first s in a double s. For example,
 Charlotte Brontë used the long s, as the first in a double s, in some of her letters, e.g., "Miſs Austen" in a letter to the critic G. H. Lewes, 12 January 1848; in other letters, however, she uses the short s, for example in an 1849 letter to Patrick Brontë, her father. Her husband Arthur Bell Nicholls used the long s in writing to Ellen Nussey of Brontë's death.
 Edward Lear regularly used the long s in his diaries in the second half of the 19th century; for example, his 1884 diary has an instance in which the first s in a double s is long: "Addreſsed".
 Wilkie Collins routinely used the long s for the first in a double s in his manuscript correspondence; for example, he used the long s in the words "mſs" (manuscripts) and "needleſs" in a 1 June 1886 letter to Daniel S. Ford.

For these as well as others, the handwritten long s may have suggested type and a certain formality as well as the traditional. Margaret Mathewson "published" her Sketch of 8 Months a Patient in the Royal Infirmary of Edinburgh, A.D. 1877 of her experiences as a patient of Joseph Lister in the Royal Infirmary of Edinburgh by writing copies out in manuscript. In place of the first s in a double s, Mathewson recreated the long s in these copies, a practice widely used for both personal and business correspondence by her family, who lived on the remote island of Yell, Shetland. The practice of using the long s in handwriting on Yell, as elsewhere, may have been a carryover from 18th-century printing conventions, but it was not unfamiliar as a convention in handwriting.

Modern usage

 
The long s survives in elongated form, with an italic-styled curled descender, as the integral symbol ∫ used in calculus. Gottfried Leibniz based the character on the Latin summa (sum), which he wrote ſumma. This use first appeared publicly in his paper De Geometria, published in Acta Eruditorum of June 1686, but he had been using it in private manuscripts at least since 29 October 1675. The integral of a function  with respect to a real variable  over the interval  is typeset as

In linguistics, a similar character (called esh) is used in the International Phonetic Alphabet, in which it represents the voiceless postalveolar fricative, the first sound in the English word ship.

In Nordic and German-speaking countries, relics of the long s continue to be seen in signs and logos that use various forms of fraktur typefaces.

The long s exists in some current OpenType digital fonts that are historic revivals, like Caslon, Garamond, and Bodoni.

In the 1993 Turkmen orthography,  represented /ʒ/; however, it was replaced in 1995 by the letter .

In Unicode 
 
 A long s with a bar diacritic,  is encoded as

Solidus or slash 

An echo of the long s survives today in the form of the mark , popularly known as a "slash" but formally named a solidus. The mark is an evolution of the long s which was used as the abbreviation for 'shilling' in Britain's pre-decimal currency, written as in "7/6" meaning "seven shillings and six pence". (The name shilling is derived from the Roman coin, the solidus.)

See also
 ß (Eszett)
 Insular S (Ꞅ)
 Esh (letter)
 Integral symbol
 R rotunda

Notes

References

External links

 .
 .
 .
 .
 .

History of the English language
Typography
Palaeographic letters
Latin-script letters
Letters with final form